The Great Lakes Water Authority (GLWA) is a regional water authority in the U.S. state of Michigan. It provides drinking water treatment, drinking water distribution, wastewater collection, and wastewater treatment services for the Southeast Michigan communities, including Wayne, Oakland, and Macomb counties, among others.  GLWA overlays a majority of the water and sewer assets which were formerly operated and maintained by the Detroit Water Sewer District (DWSD) prior to the bankruptcy of the City of Detroit, Michigan.

History
The Great Lakes Water Authority was created in the fall of 2014 under a United States bankruptcy court order issued as part of the City of Detroit bankruptcy proceedings. The Detroit City Council voted to join the authority in September 2014 by a 7–2 vote, and the county commissions of Wayne, Oakland, and Macomb counties voted to join in October 2014. The first meeting of the GLWA board was held on December 12, 2014.

The 40-year lease deal was approved on June 12, 2015, by a 5–1 vote of the Great Lakes Water Authority board, marking a historic regionalization of water control hailed by Detroit Mayor Mike Duggan. The assumption of much of Detroit Water and Sewerage Department's (DWSD) operations by the Great Lakes Water Authority will allow Detroit to fund improvements to Detroit's aging water infrastructure, such as repairs to old treatment facilities and leaking pipes. The lease payments to Detroit must be used for water purposes, and cannot be diverted to the general fund. The deal allows DWSD's workforce to be reduced from around 1,400 to around 500. The Great Lakes Water Authority will have about 900 employees.

In October 2015, following a nationwide search, Sue McCormick, the director of the Detroit Water and Sewerage Department, was named the first chief executive officer of the Great Lakes Water Authority.

GLWA formally assumed operations from the Detroit Water Sewer District on January 1, 2016. The GLWA also assumed $4 billion of DWSD's debt. The assumption of Detroit's operations and debt is under a 40-year lease that GLWA has over the City of Detroit's water system. The lease agreement was brokered in secret mediation by U.S. District Judge Sean Cox and required "lengthy and contentious negotiations" between Detroit and suburban Detroit leaders, who feared any prospect of bailing out Detroit's water system. Under the agreement, the authority will pay the City "$50 million a year plus about $50 million a year toward pension costs and a fund to help struggling customers" in exchange for the city's water system.

Governance
The Great Lakes Water Authority is governed by a board of directors. It consists of two representatives of the City of Detroit and one representative each from Oakland County, Macomb County, Wayne County, and the State of Michigan. The Detroit representatives are appointed by the mayor, the county representatives are appointed by their respective counties, and the state representative is appointed by the governor. The governor's appointee is intended to represent users of the water authority's services outside Oakland, Macomb, and Wayne, such as users in Washtenaw, Genesee, and Monroe counties.

The primary administrative center for the GLWA is the Water Board Building, which is located at 735 Randolph Street in downtown Detroit, Michigan.  The Water Board Building houses the meeting chamber for the Board of Directors, and includes offices for the management officers for the GLWA.  

Sue McCormick, who led GLWA since its inception, submitted her resignation as CEO on July 28, 2021.  McCormick stepped down after increased pressure from local leaders when a loss of sewer pumping capacity happened during the June 28 rainfall event which realized six inches of rainfall depth over the Detroit metropolitan area.  

Suzanne Coffey was named interim CEO by the GLWA Board of Directors on August 11, 2021. Coffey previously served as chief planning officer for GLWA.  

On June 27, 2022, it was announced that Suzanne Coffey would be promoted from Interim CEO to Chief Executive Officer (CEO).

Services
The utility authority provides drinking water treatment, water transmission, wastewater collection, and wastewater treatment services to almost four million customers from about 125 Michigan communities  in Wayne, Oakland, Macomb, and other counties. About 75% of the authority's customers reside in the suburbs, with the remaining customers residing in the City of Detroit.  The GLWA operates combined sewer overflow (CSO) facilities, drinking water booster pump stations, drinking water in-system storage, and wastewater pump stations.  Small-diameter local water distribution mains and sanitary sewer in the local communities remain under their individual control.  

The Central Services Facility (CSF) located at 6425 Huber Street in Detroit serves as the headquarters for all of the field maintenance staff which operate and maintain the non-treatment assets within the water distribution and wastewater collection service area.  These assets include the large capacity raw sewage pumping stations which serve to lift sewage along the main interceptors, as well as the in-system drinking water booster stations which are located throughout the water distribution system.  The CSF houses a central fusion control center which serves as a central control hub that can supervise the operation of all the treatment facilities, as well as the combined sewer overflow (CSO) assets, and security camera feeds for all GLWA properties.  

The member communities of the water distribution system are listed below:

 Allen Park, Michigan
 Auburn Hills, Michigan
 Belleville, Michigan
 Berkley, Michigan
 Beverly Hills, Michigan
 Bingham Farms, Michigan
 Birmingham, Michigan
 Bloomfield Hills, Michigan
 Bloomfield Township, Michigan
 Clawson, Michigan
 Dearborn, Michigan
 Dearborn Heights, Michigan
 Ecorse, Michigan
 Farmington, Michigan
 Farmington Hills, Michigan
 Ferndale, Michigan
 Garden City, Michigan
 Grose Ile Township, Michigan
 Grosse Pointe, Michigan
 Grosse Pointe Farms, Michigan
 Grosse Pointe Park, Michigan
 Grosse Pointe Shores, Michigan
 Hamtramck, Michigan
 Hazel Park, Michigan
 Highland Park, Michigan
 Huron Township, Michigan
 Inkster, Michigan
 Lathrup Village, Michigan
 Livonia, Michigan
 Melvindale, Michigan
 Mount Clemens, Michigan
 New Haven, Michigan
 Novi, Michigan
 Oak Park, Michigan
 Plymouth, Michigan
 Redford Township, Michigan
 River Rouge, Michigan
 Riverview, Michigan
 Rochester Hills, Michigan
 Romulus, Michigan
 Royal Oak, Michigan
 Royal Oak Charter Township, Michigan
 Southfield, Michigan
 Southgate, Michigan
 Sterling Heights, Michigan
 Taylor, Michigan
 Trenton, Michigan
 Troy, Michigan
 Utica, Michigan
 Walled Lake, Michigan
 Warren, Michigan
 Washington Township, Michigan
 Wayne, Michigan
 West Bloomfield Township, Michigan
 Westland, Michigan
 Wixom, Michigan
 Woodhaven, Michigan

The authority has not yet set water rates (which could be variable by community), although it aims to determine rates by March 2016 and make them effective by July 1, 2016. Annual rate increases will be capped at four percent for the first ten years of the authority's existence.

Structure

Drinking Water Treatment 
GLWA operates five drinking water treatment plants, one wastewater reclamation facility, nine combined sewer overflow treatment/screening facilities, water storage facilities/booster pump stations, and a central service maintenance facility.  These facilities are located within the greater Detroit metropolitan area; however, the Lake Huron Water Treatment Plant is located in Fort Gratiot Township, north of Port Huron, Michigan.

The drinking water facilities all utilize a sedimentation and deep bed filtration process to treat and purify drinking water for the residents of their service areas.  Disinfection of the treated water is accomplished by either chlorination or ozonation processes.

{
  "type": "FeatureCollection",
  "features": [
    {
      "type": "Feature",
      "properties": {
        "title": "Lake Huron Water Treatment Plant",
        "marker-color": "#AA1205"
      },
      "geometry": {
        "type": "Point",
        "coordinates": [
          -82.494535446167,
          43.0796402525152
        ]
      }
    },
    {
      "type": "Feature",
      "properties": {
        "title": "Northeast Water Treatment Plant",
        "marker-color": "#AA1205"
      },
      "geometry": {
        "type": "Point",
        "coordinates": [
          -83.01288843154909,
          42.445580544912964
        ]
      }
    },
    {
      "type": "Feature",
      "properties": {
        "title": "Water Works Park Water Treatment Plant",
        "marker-color": "#AA1205"
      },
      "geometry": {
        "type": "Point",
        "coordinates": [
          -82.97857761383058,
          42.357877962078675
        ]
      }
    },
    {
      "type": "Feature",
      "properties": {
        "title": "Springwells Water Treatment Plant",
        "marker-color": "#AA1205"
      },
      "geometry": {
        "type": "Point",
        "coordinates": [
          -83.15255641937257,
          42.3467221596652
        ]
      }
    },
    {
      "type": "Feature",
      "properties": {"title": "Southwest Water Treatment Plant", "marker-color": "#AA1205"},
      "geometry": {
        "type": "Point",
        "coordinates": [
          -83.20534229278566,
          42.22959778306524
        ]
      }
    }
  ]
}

Drinking Water Distribution

Combined Sewer Overflow Prevention and Pollution Control 

The Great Lakes Water Authority operates and maintains nine individual combined sewer overflow pollution prevention facilities located within the original combined sewer service area.  These facilities were planned and constructed in the late 1990's through the early 2000's to contain and treat wet-weather wastewater flows which originated in the legacy combined sewer areas of the Detroit metro area.

The City of Detroit was originally developed and as water and sewer services grew within the existing municipal boundary of the City, the sanitary sewer and stormwater sewers were built as a combined sewer system.  Combined sewer systems were designed to convey both dry weather sanitary waste, and during wet weather events, carry the runoff generated from the surrounding homes, business, and impervious land uses.  During wet weather, these historic outfalls would discharge raw sewage directly into the downstream receiving water bodies, such as the Rouge River and Detroit River.  The Clean Water Act required the City of Detroit to address these raw sewage outfalls by constructing the CSO pollution control facilities to prevent untreated sewage from entering the local waterways.

Intermediate Sewage Pump Stations 

{
  "type": "FeatureCollection",
  "features": [
    {
      "type": "Feature",
      "properties": {
        "title": "7 Mile CSO Facility",
        "marker-color": "#AA1205"
      },
      "geometry": {
        "type": "Point",
        "coordinates": [
          -83.27246189117433,
          42.4316371415533
        ]
      }
    },
    {
      "type": "Feature",
      "properties": {
        "title": "Puritan-Fenkell CSO Facility",
        "marker-color": "#AA1205"
      },
      "geometry": {
        "type": "Point",
        "coordinates": [
          -83.27193617820741,
          42.399336077177814
        ]
      }
    },
    {
      "type": "Feature",
      "properties": {
        "title": "Hubbell-Southfield CSO Facility",
        "marker-color": "#AA1205"
      },
      "geometry": {
        "type": "Point",
        "coordinates": [
          -83.20609331130983,
          42.30723676617776
        ]
      }
    },
    {
      "type": "Feature",
      "properties": {
        "title": "Baby Creek CSO Facility",
        "marker-color": "#AA1205"
      },
      "geometry": {
        "type": "Point",
        "coordinates": [
          -83.1410175561905,
          42.307946897120395
        ]
      }
    },
    {
      "type": "Feature",
      "properties": {
        "title": "Oakwood CSO Facility",
        "marker-color": "#AA1205"
      },
      "geometry": {
        "type": "Point",
        "coordinates": [
          -83.14340472221376,
          42.28285735954674
        ]
      }
    },
    {
      "type": "Feature",
      "properties": {
        "title": "St. Aubin CSO Facility",
        "marker-color": "#AA1205"
      },
      "geometry": {
        "type": "Point",
        "coordinates": [
          -83.02267849445344,
          42.33376007219358
        ]
      }
    },
    {
      "type": "Feature",
      "properties": {
        "title": "Leib CSO Facility",
        "marker-color": "#AA1205"
      },
      "geometry": {
        "type": "Point",
        "coordinates": [
          -83.0163323879242,
          42.35412984920747
        ]
      }
    },
    {
      "type": "Feature",
      "properties": {
        "title": "Belle Isle CSO Facility",
        "marker-color": "#AA1205"
      },
      "geometry": {
        "type": "Point",
        "coordinates": [
          -82.99756765365602,
          42.338827856751436
        ]
      }
    },
    {
      "type": "Feature",
      "properties": {"title": "Conner Creek CSO Facility", "marker-color": "#AA1205"},
      "geometry": {
        "type": "Point",
        "coordinates": [
          -82.95798897743227,
          42.36234924163794
        ]
      }
    }
  ]
}

Water Resource Recovery/ Wastewater Pollution Control 
{
  "type": "FeatureCollection",
  "features": [
    {
      "type": "Feature",
      "properties": {"stroke": "#5581A9",
      "stroke-width": 5,},
      "geometry": {
        "type": "Polygon",
        "coordinates": [
          [
            [
              -83.13410282135011,
              42.28429403804948
            ],
            [
              -83.13247203826906,
              42.286389466186584
            ],
            [
              -83.12294483184816,
              42.29000867789902
            ],
            [
              -83.12285900115968,
              42.28934199662877
            ],
            [
              -83.12182903289796,
              42.28931024972564
            ],
            [
              -83.12170028686525,
              42.29048487448625
            ],
            [
              -83.12067031860352,
              42.29083408302887
            ],
            [
              -83.1183958053589,
              42.29026264986023
            ],
            [
              -83.12028408050539,
              42.28927850280647
            ],
            [
              -83.12260150909425,
              42.28629422096508
            ],
            [
              -83.12783718109132,
              42.281944535743335
            ],
            [
              -83.13410282135011,
              42.28429403804948
            ]
          ]
        ]
      }
    }
  ]
}All of the wastewater collected from the Great Lakes Water Authority sewer service area is treated at one facility, the GLWA Water Resource Recovery Facility.  The Water Resource Recovery Facility is located at 9300 W. Jefferson Avenue, and is the second largest single-site wastewater treatment facility in North America.  The initial phase of the plant was completed in 1940, at a cost of $10 million.  Today the facility is rated for a maximum wastewater treatment capacity of 1890 million gallons/day of wet-weather sewage treatment.  The Water Resource Recovery Facility (WRRF) is classified as a wet-weather wastewater treatment facility, as it sees sewage flows fluctuate depending on rainfall depth over the sewer collection area.  When the City of Detroit was originally sewered for wastewater collection, the system was designed to collect stormwater runoff in addition to household and industrial sanitary wastewater.

Two interceptors convey raw sewage to the Water Resource Recovery Facility.  The Detroit River Interceptor (DRI) follows the Detroit River riverbank, and collects sewage from the eastern sewer service area, ultimately following Jefferson Boulevard and arriving at Pump Station No. 1 from the south.   The Oakwood Interceptor conveys raw sewage from the western service area which comprises Dearborn and the western suburbs.  The Oakwood Interceptor arrives at the WRRF from the north.  Each interceptor was originally designed to ultimately land at Pump Station No. 1 when the WRRF was placed in service in 1940. 

The original wastewater treatment works were further upgraded in 1953 and 1957, in which additional primary clarification was added to the process.  Polymer and ferric chloride feed systems were added to the plant in 1970, including a new chlorine feed system.  The Federal Water Pollution Control Act (Clean Water Act) of 1972 drove the need add secondary treatment capacity to the facility, which included the construction of aeration tanks, secondary clarifiers, cryogenic oxygen plants and additional biosolids handling facilities at the plant.

The WRRF includes two medium-lift pump stations, fourteen primary clarifiers (circular and rectangular), four secondary aeration basins, thirty secondary clarifiers, twenty-two sludge dewatering belt filter presses, eight multiple-hearth furnace incinerators, and a chlorination/dechlorination facility for managing the disinfection and subsequent residual chlorine removal of the final treated effluent.            

The WRRF relies on a liquid oxygen generation system to produce the oxygen necessary for the activated sludge aeration process used to manage the biological nutrient removal process.

Incidents 
On the early morning of March 4, 2016 a two-alarm fire broke out in the Incineration facility at the Great Lakes Water Authority Water Resource Recovery Facility.  The fire event significantly damaged belt conveyors which are used to feed dewatered process biosolids into the eight operational incinerators located within the main superstructure of the building.  The resulting fire damaged nine large belt conveyors, and resulted in roughly $40 million in overall damage to the facility.  The fire was investigated by outside engineering consultants, citing excessive sludge debris buildup, lack of maintenance, and poor operational practices as being the cause of the catastrophic fire.

Heavy rainfall events which occurred during the weekend of June 28, 2021 partially disabled the Conner Creek Pump Station and Freud Pump Stations which serve the eastside sewer service area.  Both pump stations are located near the GLWA Conner Creek CSO facility.  Ongoing investigations by an outside consultant are being completed to determine the exact cause of sewage pumping capacity which led to thousands of basements in the Grosse Pointe area being flooded with sewage.

On August 21, 2022, a  break occurred on an existing 120-inch diameter water transmission immediately downstream of the Lake Huron Water Treatment Plant which is located in Fort Gratiot Township.  The break resulted in a Boil Water Advisory which affected 23 communities across the service downstream which was served by the 120-inch watermain.  The existing main was a concrete precast transmission line.  Repairs to the main were completed on September 6, 2022.  GLWA indicated that due to the size of the main, full operational capacity of the transmission line would not be restored until September 21, 2022.

Notes

External links

Metro Detroit
Water management authorities in the United States
Water in Michigan
Great Lakes region (U.S.)
Public utilities of the United States
Government agencies established in 2014
Government of Detroit
Wayne County, Michigan
Oakland County, Michigan
Macomb County, Michigan
Economy of Flint, Michigan
2014 establishments in Michigan